In Greek mythology, the name Erymanthus (Ancient Greek: Ἑρύμανθος) may refer to:

Erymanthus, god of the river Erymanthus. He was worshipped at Psophis.
Erymanthus, son of Apollo, who saw Aphrodite bathing naked after making love with Adonis, and was blinded by the angry goddess. Apollo took revenge on Aphrodite by changing himself into a boar and killing Adonis (see Erymanthian Boar).
Erymanthus, an Arcadian king as the son of Aristas, descendant of King Lycaon. He became the father of Arrhon, and grandfather of Psophis (male). Alternately, Erymanthus was the son of Arcas, the father of Xanthus, and again grandfather of another Psophis (female).

Notes

References 

 Claudius Aelianus, Varia Historia translated by Thomas Stanley (d.1700) edition of 1665. Online version at the Topos Text Project.
 Claudius Aelianus, Claudii Aeliani de natura animalium libri xvii, varia historia, epistolae, fragmenta, Vol 2. Rudolf Hercher. In Aedibus B.G. Teubneri. Lipsiae. 1866. Greek text available at the Perseus Digital Library. 
 Pausanias, Description of Greece with an English Translation by W.H.S. Jones, Litt.D., and H.A. Ormerod, M.A., in 4 Volumes. Cambridge, MA, Harvard University Press; London, William Heinemann Ltd. 1918. . Online version at the Perseus Digital Library
 Pausanias, Graeciae Descriptio. 3 vols. Leipzig, Teubner. 1903.  Greek text available at the Perseus Digital Library.

Potamoi
Children of Apollo
Princes in Greek mythology
Mythological kings of Arcadia
Kings in Greek mythology
Arcadian mythology
Deeds of Aphrodite
Mythological blind people